Claes-Ingvar Lagerkvist (born 1944) is a Swedish astronomer at the Uppsala Astronomical Observatory. He is known for his work on the shapes and spin properties of minor planets.

He has discovered three comets, P/1996 R2, C/1996 R3 and 308P/Lagerkvist-Carsenty.

He has also discovered a number of asteroids, including the Trojan asteroid (37732) 1996 TY68. Asteroid 2875 Lagerkvist, discovered February 11, 1983 by Edward L. G. Bowell of the Lowell Observatory Near-Earth-Object Search (LONEOS), was named in his honour.

List of discovered minor planets

References

External links
Uppsala University Directory: Claes-Ingvar Lagerkvist, accessed on 4 April 2014
IAU: Claes-Ingvar Lagerkvist, accessed on 4 April 2014

1944 births
20th-century Swedish astronomers
Discoverers of asteroids
Uppsala University alumni
Living people